Witness for the Defense may refer to:

 Witness for the Defense (Murder, She Wrote), an episode of Murder, She Wrote
 Witness for the Defense (Star Trek: The Role Playing Game), a 1983 role-playing game
 The Witness for the Defence (novel), a 1913 novel by A.E.W. Mason
 The Witness for the Defense, a 1919 American silent drama, based on the novel